Simon Rohrich is an American inventor  and entrepreneur who is the co-founder and Chief Technology Evangelist of Elliptical Mobile Solutions, a provider of mobile micro-modular data centers. He defined the specific technology type of his data centers in a 2010 white paper, coining the term micro modular data center (MMDC) and creating the specific technology. This technology has been used by numerous corporations (including AOL and Virgin Galactic) and governmental entities (including China, Vietnam, and the City of Avondale). Rohrich is also known for his participation in the Armored Combat League (ACL) along with the Society for Creative Anachronism's armoured combat tournaments and events.

Early life and education
Rohrich was born in 1975 in North Dakota. In 1981, his mother, Helen, divorced his father and the two moved to Minnesota when Rohrich was 7 years old. He was largely raised by his mother and was an only child. At the age of 13, he enrolled in an electronics class at a local junior college. In 1990, a 16-year-old Rohrich was sent to live with his father in Mesa, Arizona. He attended Red Mountain High School in Mesa and worked as a dishwasher at a local Shoney's restaurant. After graduating high school, Rohrich moved in with Sean Delaney, a music producer who had once worked with the rock band, KISS. Rohrich also attended Northern Arizona University for a year before dropping out to pursue a career in data center production.

Business career
Rohrich's career began when longtime friend and fellow inventor, Bill Woodbury, approached him with an entrepreneurial opportunity in 2004. Woodbury and Rohrich co-founded Elliptical Mobile Solutions in 2005 with Mike Chaput and Joe Robbins. The company was started in a garage in Phoenix, Arizona, but moved to a permanent location in Chandler, Arizona in 2009. Their primary goal was the production of micro-modular data centers that were both mobile and extremely durable. They also constructed items for computer and server safety and organization.

The first "prototype" data center was built inside an RV that allowed Rohrich and his team to drive it around to investors. The S.P.E.A.R. (Self-Propelled Electronic Armored Rack) was the initial micro-modular data center produced by Elliptical Mobile Solutions. Rohrich and Woodbury collaborated on the construction, research, and schematics of the machine. The model was featured in a 2008 episode of the Discovery Channel series, Smash Lab where tests showed that it could withstand up to 1,900 degrees (Fahrenheit) of heat. The 27-inch wide S.P.E.A.R. was fitted with wheels and was also designed to hold 1,000 pounds of equipment while being completely waterproof.

Rohrich was also instrumental in the production of many of the company's other technologies, including:

 S.H.I.E.L.D. (Structurally Hardened I/0 Locking Device) - a weatherproof connection panel for computers.
 C-S.P.E.A.R. - a smaller version of the original S.P.E.A.R.
 R.A.S.E.R. (Relocatable, Adaptive, Suspension, Equipment Rack) - a variation of the portable, rackable data center with internal cooling in a 42U, fireproof enclosure.
 R.A.S.E.R. HD (Relocatable, Adaptive, Suspension, Equipment Rack, High Density) - a 42U enclosure capable of handling IT loads of 80 kW and equipped with a "warm-water" (65° to 85 °F) cooling system.

The City of Avondale, Arizona was one of the first entities to purchase a device (the C-S.P.E.A.R.) from Elliptical Mobile Solutions. In 2010, Rohrich wrote a white paper detailing the data center technology and seeking a market for the S.P.E.A.R. units. The company also acquired its fourth patent in 2010. In that same year, Rohrich traveled with Woodbury and Elliptical CEO, Bill Stockwell, to Hanoi to give presentations at the Vietnam Internet Network Information Center. Vietnam's technology and communications ministry designated Elliptical as the company they'd use for micro-modular data centers. By 2011, most of the units the company had sold had gone to governmental agencies, including those in Canada and the Hopi Nation.

In January 2011, Rohrich was a guest speaker at Data Center 2011, an annual conference held in Israel. In 2012, Rohrich helped oversee a partnership between Elliptical Mobile Solutions and AOL. AOL began using the R.A.S.E.R. HD units for its own outdoor micro data centers. In 2012, AOL's outdoor R.A.S.E.R. HD units were able to withstand the high winds and rain of Hurricane Sandy. Rohrich also helped facilitate a partnership between Elliptical, Virgin Galactic, and the Federal Aviation Administration to help test radiation levels for commercial spaceflight in 2013. The R.A.S.E.R. HD units were used because they could use more data without taking up space or requiring the construction of a new supercomputer.

Medieval sports

Rohrich has been an active participant in the Society for Creative Anachronism's (SCA) armoured combat tournaments and events since the mid-1990s at age 19. He met fellow Elliptical Mobile Solutions co-founder, Bill Woodbury, at SCA events nearly a decade before the founding of the company. While in combat in SCA tournaments, Rohrich uses the persona of Baron Josef Donnerbauch. He also participates in the Armored Combat League (ACL) of the International Medieval Combat Federation (IMCF), an international governing body of medieval combat, also called historical medieval battles (HMB). He has been a member of the Striking Eagles, the All-Star squad for the United States, since 2013. He is also a member of the Desert Demons, a regional squad based in Arizona.

Patents
 Method and apparatus for an electronic equipment rack, filed December 8, 2006, issued July 7, 2009
 Method and apparatus for an environmentally-protected electronic equipment enclosure, filed November 17, 2009, issued April 23, 2013
 Method and apparatus for a close-coupled cooling system, filed October 3, 2011, issued April 4, 2013

References

External links
Official Website
Elliptical Mobile Solutions Official Website

Living people
Businesspeople from Phoenix, Arizona
Year of birth missing (living people)